Bledudo was a legendary king of the Britons as accounted by Geoffrey of Monmouth and the second to bear this name.  He was preceded by Merianus and succeeded by Cap.

References

Legendary British kings
2nd-century BC legendary rulers